Donald Anthony Low  (22 June 1927 – 12 February 2015), known as Anthony Low or D. A. Low, was a historian of modern South Asia, Africa, the British Commonwealth, and, especially, decolonization.  He was the Emeritus Smuts Professor of History of the British Commonwealth at the University of Cambridge, former Vice-Chancellor of the Australian National University, Canberra, and President of Clare Hall, Cambridge.

Education 
Low was born in 1927 and gained his doctorate from Oxford University.

Career highlights
The academic positions which Professor Low has held include the following:

Founding Dean of the School of African and Asian Studies, University of Sussex, 1968–1971
Dean, Research School of Pacific and Asian Studies (RSPAS), Australian National University, 1973–1974
Vice Chancellor, Australian National University, Canberra, 1975–1982
Smuts Professor of the History of the British Commonwealth, University of Cambridge, 1983–1994
President, Clare Hall, University of Cambridge, 1987–1994

Fellowships
 Fellow of the Australian Academy of the Humanities (FAHA)
 Fellow of the Academy of the Social Sciences in Australia (FASSA)
 Fellow of the Royal Historical Society (FRHistS)
 Honorary Fellow of  Exeter College, Oxford.

Selected bibliography

Books

Chapters in books

References

External links

1927 births
2015 deaths
Academics of the University of Sussex
Alumni of Exeter College, Oxford
Fellows of the Australian Academy of the Humanities
Historians of South Asia
Presidents of Clare Hall, Cambridge
Academic staff of the Australian National University
Smuts Professors of Commonwealth History
Officers of the Order of Australia
Recipients of the Centenary Medal
Fellows of the Royal Historical Society
Fellows of the Academy of the Social Sciences in Australia
Australian historians
Vice-Chancellors of the Australian National University
British people in colonial India